Celia is an artificially intelligent virtual assistant developed by Huawei for their latest HarmonyOS and Android-based EMUI smartphones that lack Google Services and a Google Assistant. The assistant can perform day-to-day tasks, which include making a phone call, setting a reminder and checking the weather. It was unveiled on 7 April 2020 and got publicly released on 27 April 2020 via an OTA update solely to selected devices that can update their software to EMUI 10.1.

Huawei had initially referred to the new assistant in late 2019 by having announced that there would be an English version of their already Chinese speaker assistant—Xiaoyi—to be released into the European markets. Due to the on-going China–United States trade war, the company's newly released smartphones were left without a virtual assistant. This subsequently led to the development and release of Celia.

AI technology is integrated into the software of Celia, which allows it to translate text using a phones camera and to identify everyday objects — similar to that of Google Lens.

Features 

Celia has many features that are similar to that of its rivals: the Google Assistant and Siri. It can be triggered by the words, 'Hey Celia' or be summoned by pressing and holding down on the power button. The default search engine for Celia is Bing, but this can be changed in settings. Celia can make calls, check the agenda, send a message, show the weather, set alarms and control home appliances. The assistant also has the ability to integrate itself with the stock apps of the EMUI software and toggle with the device's settings, such as by turning on the flashlight and playing multimedia content, but with the users command. With the AI that is installed in Celia, it can identify food, everyday objects and translate text using the phones camera.

Availability by country and language 

Currently, Celia is available only in German, English, French and Spanish, and has been released in Germany, the UK, France, Spain, Chile, Mexico and Colombia. Huawei has said that there will be more regions and languages to come.

Compatible devices 

Celia only became available with the EMUI 10.1 update that was released in April, which means that a limited number of devices are compatible with it. More devices will be added to the list throughout the coming months as Celia's availability increases. The current list is shown below:

Huawei P series 
 Huawei P50 (Pro)
 Huawei P40 (Lite, Pro & Pro+)
Huawei P30 (Pro)

Huawei Mate series 
Huawei Mate 40
Huawei Mate 30 (Lite, Pro & RS Porche Design)
 Huawei MatePad Pro
Huawei Mate 20 (Pro, 20X 4G, 20X 5G and RS Porche Design)
Huawei Mate X & Xs

Huawei Nova series

Huawei Nova 6 (Nova 6 5G & Nova 6 SE)
Huawei Nova 5 (Nova 5 Pro, Nova 5i Pro & Nova 5Z)
Huawei Nova Y60

Huawei Enjoy series

 Huawei Enjoy 10S

Issues 

Technology news website Engadget has noted that when saying, 'Hey Celia', out aloud in the presence of an iPhone, Siri will respond along with Celia; this is apparently because 'Celia' sounds similar to 'Siri'.

See also 

 Alexa
 Cortana
 Siri
 Comparison of notable virtual assistants
 Applications of artificial intelligence

References

External links 

 

Virtual assistants
Huawei products
2020 software